Edward Gajdel (born August 1, 1958) is a Polish-born photographer based in Toronto, Ontario, Canada, best known for his celebrity portraits and art photography.

Early life 
Edward was born in Sokolka, Poland and is the son of a Russian born father and a Polish mother.  Gajdel's parents met in a German labour camp during the Second World War.
In 1967 Gajdel emigrated to Canada with his family and settled in Beiseker, Alberta. 
His first encounter with photography was at age 6 when he observed his sister making black and white prints in a makeshift darkroom. At the time he was mesmerized by the magic of the process and it never left him.   It wasn't until he was 17 years old after having emigrated to Canada with his parents that he knew he wanted to dedicate his life to this art form.

Career 
His work has been published in numerous international magazines and is part of the permanent collection of the Canadian Museum of Contemporary Art and the Portrait Gallery of Canada. His commercial work is part of a collection of "50 Years of Advertising" in the Royal Ontario Museum.

(Polaroid) P Magazine featured Gajdel in an article titled "Man of the People" in which Oscar Peterson was quoted as saying, "I never feel as though I'm merely having my photograph taken. I feel part of something larger, something creative and lasting. On film Edward can capture what I want to say through music."

Honors 
Gajdel has won numerous honours from organizations such as the Communication Arts - (eleven Awards of Excellence for various editorial and advertisings campaigns,)  The National Magazine Awards Foundation - gold silver and honourable mentions for various Canadian publications including Toronto Life, Canadian Business, Financial Times, The Globe and Mail, enRoute and others. The Canadian Association of Professional Image Creators (CAPIC), The Advertising and Design Club of Canada Awards, Art Directors Club of Toronto Annual Awards Show, Applied Arts Magazine Annual Awards, 
American Photography Annual,  World Press Photo, have also honoured Gajdel. He is the recipient of the Queen Elizabeth II Diamond Jubilee Medal.
The Innoversity Creative Summit in October 2014  which highlights innovation, creativity and diversity in the Canadian media recognized Edward for his contribution in making Canadian media more inclusive and innovative.

Professional career 
In 1978 Gajdel enrolled in the Photographic Arts Program the Northern Alberta Institute of Technology. Shortly after graduating he enrolled in a  workshop with Michel Tcherevkoff and was subsequently invited to intern with him in New York.

He returned to Calgary and immediately began to build  a reputation for himself in the advertising and editorial world. As a young shooter Gajdel embraced everything around him as potential subject matter.  H began photographing rock concerts for Brimstone Productions and at the same time developing his eye for fashion photography and still life but ultimately it was portraiture that would own his heart.
In the fall of 1983 he left Canada to return to Europe to pursue opportunities with Vogue Italia.

Though he was taken on their roster and was to start shooting for them in early 1984  he returned to Canada for the Christmas break, got engaged and was married six months later to Djanka, who he had met just a few months before leaving for Europe.

A coin toss saw them set up shop in Toronto, his wife's hometown in June 1984.

After settling in Toronto, Gajdel began assisting a number of fashion photographers. Soon after he attracted editorial work for the likes of Toronto Life Magazine, Flare, Entertainment Weekly and MacLeans. It wasn't long before he set up his own studio and began producing work for various corporate, advertising and editorial clients around the world garnering hundreds of awards.

Personal life and other activities

 He has three children
 As his career blossomed he has shot for hundreds of international magazines from GQ, to Elle, Time - Fortune, Esquire - Life
 He has made portraits of Prime Ministers, The President of Chile and two Mexican Presidents.
 He has shot the Who's Who of Hollywood from Stephen King, to Tom Hanks.  From Marcia Gaye Harden to Norman Jewison to Faye Dunaway.
 He has photographed some of the most prestigious individuals from scientists and doctors, to poets and painters.
 He has garnered the reputation of being the Irving Penn of Canada and is known for his tremendous skill of painting with light.
 Known as a monk behind the lens, Gajdel maintains a quiet and powerful disposition as he captures the essence of his subjects.
 He is known for altering and amending his equipment so that it best suits his application and permits him the versatility he requires.

With the transformation in the visual medium due to the onset of digital photography, Gajdel left photography temporarily to explore the different ways that people communicate visually.  The written word has been a compelling vehicle for him.

Struggling as child to quickly assimilate as a new immigrant to Canada he has come to appreciate the different ways that one can communicate and this insight has illustrated itself in his photography having multiple levels and truly reflecting the old adage of a 'photograph is worth a thousand words.'

In his research and development  he has become the father and creator of the nonlinear portrait© which reflects the digital sensibilities of what is happening in the current changing medium of photography.
The nonlinear portrait© enables Gajdel to communicate in a way that is personal to his artistic beliefs  creating a succinct, insightful reflection of his subjects. 
Always the pioneer in all levels of his work, the nonlinear portrait© raises the bar for Edward in a way that is conducive to other technologies that exist

For over 40 years he continues to delve in the medium of photography as a way of communication and is working on a book that reflects that journey. He was the first Canadian photo-laureate commission in 2016 for what is now LOT42 Global Flex Campus in Kitchener, Ontario. His first short firm called "Repeat" played at the Berlin and Buffalo Film festival and his 2017 documentary called "Just An Inconvenience, A Portrait of Rosemary,"  played at the Buffalo Film Festival. He  is presently engaged in a documentary featuring Dr. Duke Redbird and an array of projects focused around the theme of Consciousness.  

Gajdel has spent his career lecturing and offering  internships  to students who have an allegiance to the discipline of photography.
He maintains  the integrity of the medium throughout its transition from analogue to digital in the area of copyright recognizing the value of content in the area of communication.
Edward has been a member of CAPIC since 1981 and ASMP since 1992.

He was most positively influenced by the tremendous generosity displayed to his family upon their  arrival to Canada and has dedicated his talents each year to enable a charitable organization in realizing their goals.
Edward has maintained throughout his career a component of giving back in the area of education and assisting several charitable organizations over the past 4 decades so they can realize their success.
He supports the most vulnerable in society particularly the homeless and children.

His work is compared to Irving Penn and Albert Watson for its intense mood and he has been called the contemporary "Karsh of Canada"
Gajdel reinvents himself every five years destroying all manners in which he has created his work to adapt to  the new technologies that exist and tailoring them for his eyes and sensibilities
He currently resides in Toronto though his work takes him all over the world.

Signature photographs - Leonard Cohen, Oscar Peterson, Stephen King, Margaret Atwood, Norman Jewison, Chris Farley, Leslie Nielsen, Metallica, David Cronenberg, John Irving, Tomson Highway, Irving Layton, Edgar Bronfman Jr., Sarah Polley, Cast of Frasier
Signature commercial projects - Coca-Cola, Economic Development Trade and Tourism - Ontario, One World American/Delta Airlines, Air Canada, Price Waterhouse Coopers, Lotus Notes,

References

External links 
Official website

1958 births
Living people
Canadian photographers
Polish emigrants to Canada
People from Sokółka
Artists from Toronto
21st-century Canadian photographers
20th-century Canadian photographers